The Queen's Mediterranean Medal was authorised by King Edward VII and was awarded to Militia troops who had replaced their regular Army counterparts in the various military garrisons across the Mediterranean, in Gibraltar, Malta and Egypt.  This allowed regular troops to be available for the Second Boer War.

Troops on the island of St. Helena who guarded Boer prisoners of war in the POW camp were awarded the Queen's South Africa Medal without clasp.

The medal and ribbon are identical to the Queen's South Africa Medal 1899-1902 except the inscription 'SOUTH AFRICA' has been replaced by the word 'MEDITERRANEAN' on the reverse of the medal. No clasps were awarded. The recipient's name and details were impressed on the rim of the medal.

Recipients
Approximately 5,000 of the Queen's Mediterranean Medal were awarded. They were issued to eligible officers and men in the Third (Militia) Battalions of the: Royal Northumberland Fusiliers, Royal Fusiliers, West Yorkshire Regiment, Royal North Lancashire Regiment, Royal West Kent Regiment, King's Own Yorkshire Light Infantry, Seaforth Highlanders and the Royal Munster Fusiliers.

References

External links
Queen's Mediterranean Medal on Anglo Boer War.com

British campaign medals
Second Boer War